Raša may refer to:
 Raša, Istria County, a town in Istria
 Raša (river), a river in Istria
 11400 Raša, an asteroid named after the river
 Raša, Slovenia, an abandoned settlement in Slovenia